Atlantı is a village in the Tunceli District, Tunceli Province, Turkey. The village is populated by Kurds of different tribal affiliations and had a population of 52 in 2021.

The hamlets of Aşağıatlantı, Duttepe, Gedikli, Güneli, Kutlu, Oluklu, Sandaldere and Sarıçiçek are attached to the village.

References 

Villages in Tunceli District
Kurdish settlements in Tunceli Province